Gwardia Ludowa WRN was a leftist mainstream political organization; to learn more about the communist pro-Soviet formation see Gwardia Ludowa.

Gwardia Ludowa WRN (GL WRN, People's Guard of WRN) was a part of the Polish resistance movement in World War II. Created in 1939 by the WRN faction, since 1940 it was subordinated to ZWZ (name changed to Armia Krajowa (AK) in 1942) with a degree of autonomy. 

In 1944 Gwardia Ludowa WRN numbered about 42,000 people. It was disbanded in early 1945.
Together with the Home Army or Armia Krajowa (AK) proper, the People's Guard "Freedom Equality Independence" did try, and on a small scale succeeded (some remote areas only), in providing the Polish citizens with the Polish Underground Police and court system independent from that of the Nazi German occupant. The civilian head of the Gwardia Ludowa WRN was Kazimierz Puzak.

References 
 Gwardia Ludowa WRN on WIEM Encyklopedia

1939 establishments in Poland
1945 disestablishments in Poland
Military units and formations disestablished in 1945
Military units and formations of Poland in World War II
Polish Socialist Party
Polish underground organisations during World War II
World War II resistance movements